The Electricity (Financial Provisions) (Scotland) Act 1988 (1988 c. 37) is an Act of the Parliament of the United Kingdom which raised the financial limit of Scottish Electricity Boards imposed by earlier legislation.

Background 
Section 29(1) of the Electricity (Scotland) Act 1979 imposed a limit of £2,300 million on stocks, loans and financial advances held by the Scottish Electricity Boards. This limit was increased to £2,700 million by Statutory Instrument 1985/1253 Electricity (Borrowing Powers) (Scotland) Order 1985.

The present Act increases this limit to £3,000 million.

Electricity (Financial Provisions) (Scotland) Act 1988 
The Electricity (Financial Provisions) (Scotland) Act 1988, received Royal Assent on 29 July 1988. Its long title is ‘An Act to raise the financial limit imposed by and by virtue of section 29(1) of the Electricity (Scotland) Act 1979.’

Provisions 
The Act comprised two Sections:

 Section 1 Limit on borrowing etc. of the Scottish Electricity Boards. Increases the financial limit on stocks held and borrowing to £3,000 million, repeals the Electricity (Financial Provisions) (Scotland) Act 1982 and section 40(5) of the Electricity (Scotland) Act 1979.
 Section 2 Short title and extent. The Act extends only to Scotland.

Effects of the Act 
The effects of the Act were:

 Increased the financial limit on borrowing of the Scottish Electricity Boards to £3,000 million,
 Repealed the Electricity (Financial Provisions) (Scotland) Act 1982,
 Repealed section 40(5) of the Electricity (Scotland) Act 1979.

Repeal 
The Act was repealed by the Electricity Act 1989 (Schedule 18)

See also 

 Timeline of the UK electricity supply industry

References 

United Kingdom Acts of Parliament 1988
Electric power in the United Kingdom